Sominot, officially the Municipality of Sominot (Subanen: Benwa Sominot; Chavacano: Municipalidad de Sominot), is a 5th class municipality in the province of Zamboanga del Sur, Philippines. According to the 2020 census, it has a population of 19,061 people.

The town was formerly known as Don Mariano Marcos, named after President Ferdinand Marcos' father Mariano Marcos, until it was renamed on September 12, 1988.

Geography

Barangays
Sominot is politically subdivided into 18 barangays.

Climate

Demographics

Economy

References

External links
 Sominot Profile at PhilAtlas.com
 [ Philippine Standard Geographic Code]
Philippine Census Information

Municipalities of Zamboanga del Sur